The 2017–18 Munster Rugby season was Munster's seventeenth season competing in the Pro14, alongside which they also competed in the European Rugby Champions Cup. It was Rassie Erasmus's second season as director of rugby and Johann van Graan's first as head coach.

Events

In June 2017, after many weeks of media speculation, Munster confirmed that director of rugby Rassie Erasmus and Defence Coach Jacques Nienaber would leave their roles with the province and return to South Africa on 31 December 2017. In the same month however, coaches Jerry Flannery and Felix Jones extended their contracts with the province by two years, both expanding their roles to forwards coach and backline and attack coach respectively. Team manager Niall O'Donovan also signed a new three-year contract.	

In the provinces only pre-season fixture, Munster beat English side Worcester Warriors 35–26 in Sixways Stadium on 24 August. The match saw former Munster stalwarts Peter Stringer and Donncha O'Callaghan play against their old club, while new signings Chris Farrell, Gerbrandt Grobler and James Hart made their non-competitive debuts for Munster. Munster began their 2017–18 Pro14 campaign on 1 September 2017, scoring six tries on their way to a comfortable 34–3 win against Benetton. In October 2017, Munster confirmed that then-South Africa Forwards Coach Johann van Graan would join the province in November as their new head coach. In the same month, it was announced that Munster's all-time leading try scorer, Simon Zebo, would leave the province at the end of the season.

In Rounds 1 & 2 of the 2017–18 European Rugby Champions Cup in October 2017, Munster drew 17–17 away to Castres before earning a 14–7 win at home to Racing 92. Erasmus and Nienaber left the province in early November 2017, with the province confirming their departure on 13 November 2017. Johann van Graan's first official game as Munster's new head coach was a 36–19 win away against Zebre in the Pro14 on 26 November 2017.  Defence Coach JP Ferreira joined Munster in December 2017. In the December Champions Cup double-header against Leicester Tigers, Munster won 33–10 at home before winning 25–16 away, their first win at Welford Road for 11 years. In doing so, Munster became the first team to defeat Leicester in both games of the double-header since they were introduced in 1999, while the home victory also saw Munster surpass 4,000 points in the competition. In Rounds 5 & 6 of the Champions Cup, Munster lost 34–30 away to Racing 92 before beating Castres 48–3 at home, securing a record 17th quarter-final. Munster beat 3-time tournament champions Toulon 20–19 in the quarter-final after a late Andrew Conway try and conversion from Ian Keatley. In the semi-final, Munster were beaten 27–22 by their French pool 4 opponents Racing 92.

Munster finished 2nd in Conference A of the 2017–18 Pro14 season on 69 points. In their semi-final qualifier against Edinburgh on 5 May 2018, Munster won 20–16 to progress to a semi-final away from home. In the semi-final against recently-crowned Champions Cup winners and arch-rivals Leinster on 19 May 2018, Munster lost 16–15, bringing to an end their 2017–18 season.

Coaching and management staff 2017–18

Senior playing squad 2017–18
Munster player movements for the 2017–18 season. For a full list, see List of 2017–18 Pro14 transfers.

Players in
 Chris Farrell from  Grenoble
 JJ Hanrahan from  Northampton Saints
 James Hart from  Racing 92
 Brian Scott promoted from Academy
 Conor Oliver promoted from Academy
 Bill Johnston promoted from Academy
 Dan Goggin promoted from Academy
 Stephen Fitzgerald promoted from Academy
 Chris Cloete from  Southern Kings\Pumas
 Gerbrandt Grobler from  Racing 92
 Ciaran Parker from  Sale Sharks
 Mark Flanagan from  Saracens (three-month loan)
 Jeremy Loughman from  Leinster (three-month contract)

Players out
 Dave Foley to  Pau
 Cian Bohane retired
 Rory Burke to  Nottingham
 Mark Chisholm retired
 Donnacha Ryan to  Racing 92
 John Madigan to  Massy
 Peter McCabe to  Connacht
 Francis Saili to  Harlequins
 Duncan Casey to  Grenoble

The Munster senior squad for 2017–18 is:

 Internationally capped players in bold.
 Players qualified to play for Ireland on residency or dual nationality. *
 Irish provinces are currently limited to four non-Irish eligible (NIE) players and one non-Irish qualified player (NIQ or "Project Player").
Notes:

2017–18 Pro14

Round 1

Round 2

Round 3

Round 4

Round 5

Round 6

Round 7

Round 8

Round 9

Round 10

Round 11

Round 12

Round 13

Round 14

Round 15

Round 16

Round 17

Round 17 rescheduled match

 Match rescheduled from 2 March 2018.

Round 18

Round 19

Round 20

Round 21

Semi-final qualifier

Semi-final

2017–18 European Rugby Champions Cup

Munster faced Racing 92, Leicester Tigers and Castres Olympique in Pool 4 of the 2017–18 European Rugby Champions Cup. They were seeded in Tier 1 following their 1st place finish in the regular 2016–17 Pro12 season.

Round 1

Round 2

Round 3

Round 4

Round 5

Round 6

Quarter-final

Semi-final

References

External links

2017-18
2017–18 Pro14 by team
2017–18 in Irish rugby union
2017–18 European Rugby Champions Cup by team